The East Coast Rugby Conference is a college rugby conference, founded in 2011 after USA Rugby decided that collegiate rugby teams would leave their local area unions and form independent conferences.  Seven teams participated in the inaugural season.

In 2012, the league expanded and added an eighth team, with American International College joining the league as an associate member. They were voted into full membership for the Fall 2013 league season.

Members

2011 
Boston College played at the 2011 Collegiate Rugby Championship. The CRC, held every June at PPL Park in Philadelphia, is the highest profile college rugby tournament in the US, and is broadcast live on NBC.  The opening round of fixtures took place on September 17, 2011.  Northeastern won the conference's inaugural season, earning a bid to the round of 16 of the D1-AA tournament.  The conference also hosted a 7's tournament on November 5, with the winner getting an automatic bid to the USA Rugby Sevens Collegiate National Championships.  Boston College defeated the University of Albany 36–10 in the final, but declined the bid to the national championships.

Final standings

2012 

The opening round of fixtures for the 2012 season will take place on September 15.  The 2nd annual East Coast Rugby Conference 7's tournament was won by Northeastern University, who defeated Middlebury College 12-7 in the final.  Northeastern accepted their bid to the 2012 USA Rugby Sevens Collegiate National Championships, and were joined by Middlebury, who accepted an at-large bid.  Both teams performed admirably, with Middlebury posting a 2-3 record for the tournament, losing 14-7 to defending Division 1-AA champion Davenport University in the Shield semi-final.  Northeastern finished 2-1 in their group, losing only to defending 7's national champion Life University on the first day, followed by a second day loss to Cal Poly in the quarterfinals.

Final standings

2013 

Southern Connecticut has dropped out of the ECRC, no replacement named.

Final standings

References

External links
 East Coast Conference at URugby

College rugby conferences in the United States
2011 establishments in the United States